Hensbarrow is a natural region in the county of Cornwall, England, UK, that has been recognized as National Character Area 154 by Natural England.

Hensbarrow is an upland region covering an area of just under 12,000 hectares immediately north of St Austell. It is bounded in the north by the A30 road and runs from Retew and Treviscoe in the west to Redmoor and Penpillick in the east. It is the remnant of a much larger exposed and windswept heather moorland. Its lower, more sheltered areas are covered by irregular livestock fields enclosed by Cornish hedges of stone walls, with scattered hamlets and farmsteads. China clay pits, sand tips and mica dams occupy much of the central area. Its highest point is Hensbarrow Beacon (1025 ft).

References

Further reading

Collins, Joseph Henry The Hensbarrow Granite District, 1878, republished 1992, 

Natural regions of England
Moorlands of Cornwall
Geography of Cornwall